The Kronstorfer Messe, WAB 146, is a missa brevis composed by Anton Bruckner in 1843-1844.

History 
Bruckner composed the Kronstorfer Messe, WAB 146, in 1843–1844, while he was a schoolteacher's assistant in Kronstorf. This Choral-Messe in D minor for mixed choir a cappella was presumably intended for the Lenten season.

The work, the manuscript of which was archived in the St. Florian Monastery, was premiered by Augustinus Franz Kropfreiter on 1 December 1974 in the church of the monastery.

Setting 
The work is divided into four parts:
 Kyrie - Adagio, D minor
 Sanctus - Adagio, B-flat major
 Benedictus - Andante, F major
 Agnus Dei - Adagio, F major
Total duration: about 5 minutes.

This Missa brevis, also called  [], exhibits relationships to Palestrina's style. The mass survives only in a fragmentary state, without Credo. The manuscript, with, on the front page, an autograph indication "Sine Gloria", contains two blank pages with an autograph indication that they were to contain a Credo in F major.

Alike the contemporaneous Asperges me in F major (WAB 4), the Agnus Dei in F major contains audacious modulations.

Note 
The Sanctus is re-used in a slightly modified setting for that of the next Messe für den Gründonnerstag.

Discography 
There are two recordings of the Mass:
Jussi Kauranen, Pirkanpojat boys' choir, Tampere (Finland), Tuhansin Kielin – CD PPCD 02, edited by the choir, 1998
Sigvards Klava, Latvian Radio Choir, Bruckner: Latin Motets – CD Ondine OD 1362, 2019

References

Sources 
 Anton Bruckner – Sämtliche Werke, Band XXI: Kleine Kirchenmusikwerke, Musikwissenschaftlicher Verlag der Internationalen Bruckner-Gesellschaft, Hans Bauernfeind and Leopold Nowak (Editor), Vienna, 1984/2001
 Uwe Harten, Anton Bruckner. Ein Handbuch. , Salzburg, 1996. .
 James Garrat, Palestrina and the German Romantic Imagination, Cambridge University Press, Cambridge, 2004. 
 John Williamson, The Cambridge Companion to Bruckner, Cambridge University Press, Cambridge, 2004. 
 Cornelis van Zwol, Anton Bruckner – Leven en Werken, Uit. Thot, Bussum, NL, 2012.

External links 
Messe ohne Gloria und Credo / Kronstorfer Messe, d-mol WAB 146 Critical discography by Hans Roelofs  

Smaller sacred works (1835–1892) Gesamtausgabe – Volume XXI
Live performances of the Kronstorfer Messe: 
Erich Nowotny with the church choir of Kronstorf (20 May 1987) on John Berky's website: The "Kronstorf Mass".
 Michael Stenov with the Cantores Carmeli (13 April 2017) on YouTube: Anton Bruckner – Kronstorfer Messe WAB 146, Christus factus est WAB 9 etc.

Masses by Anton Bruckner
Compositions in D minor
1843 compositions